is a railway station on the Minamiaso Railway Takamori Line in Minamiaso Village, Aso District, Kumamoto Prefecture, Japan.

Since the 2016 Kumamoto earthquakes, the station has suspended operations due to severe damage on the line.

Station layout 
The station is built at-grade and has a single platform with one track.

Usage

History 
 October 1, 1986 - Station opened for business.
 April 14–16, 2016 - the Kumamoto Earthquake caused damage to bridges and tunnels on the Takamori line, and operations have since been suspended.

References

External links 
 Official website (in Japanese)

Railway stations in Kumamoto Prefecture